John Crooks may refer to:
John Crooks (rugby league), Australian rugby league footballer
John Crooks (priest) (1914–1995), Dean of Armagh
Jack Crooks (John Charles Crooks, 1865–1918), American baseball player

See also
John Crook (disambiguation)
John Crookes (1890–1948), English cricketer